Jan Ertsborn (born 1944) is a Swedish Liberal People's Party politician. He has been a member of the Riksdag since 2002. 

In October 2007, Jan Ertsborn called for the Swedish government to make bestiality illegal in the country, believing the cause for it to be legal to be unjustified. From 2012 to 2014 he was the Third Deputy Speaker of the Riksdag. He was succeeded by Esabelle Dingizian.

References

1944 births
Living people
Members of the Riksdag 2002–2006
Members of the Riksdag 2006–2010
Members of the Riksdag 2010–2014
Members of the Riksdag from the Liberals (Sweden)